Cornelia Antonia "Carla" Quint (born 22 September 1972) was a Dutch female water polo player. She was a member of the Netherlands women's national water polo team. 

She competed with the team at the 2000 Summer Olympics. She was also part of the national team at the 1998 World Aquatics Championships and 2003 World Aquatics Championships.

See also
 List of World Aquatics Championships medalists in water polo

References

External links
 

1972 births
Living people
Dutch female water polo players
Water polo players at the 2000 Summer Olympics
Olympic water polo players of the Netherlands
People from Wageningen
Sportspeople from Gelderland